The Shanghai Ocean Aquarium is a public aquarium located in Shanghai, China.

Designed by Advanced Aquarium Technologies, the aquarium includes a  tunnel that takes visitors through a coastal reef, open ocean, a kelp cave, shark cove, and a coral reef, and is one of the longest such tunnels in the world. The aquarium takes visitors through several exhibit "zones," including China Zone, South America Zone, Africa Zone, etc.

Animals 

Archerfish
Blackback Butterflyfish
Blue tang
Chinese alligator
Chinese Sturgeon
Chinese giant salamander
Chinese water dragon
Cichlids
Electric eel
Freshwater sawfish
Giant gourami
Giant grouper
Clown featherback
Black ghost knife fish
Sand tiger shark
Blacktip reef shark
Green sea turtle
Horseshoe crab
Humboldt penguin
Cofish
Humphead wrasse
Japanese giant spider crab
Port Jackson shark
Leafy sea dragon
Lion fish
Moorish Idol
Spot-fin porcupinefish
Pirarucu
Rainbowfish
Seahorses
South American lungfish
Spotted eagle ray
Cownose ray
Shark ray
Spotted seal
Tawny nurse shark
Walking catfish
Weedy sea dragon
Moon jelly
Pacific Sea Nettles
Egg-yolk Jellyfish
Neon Jellyfish
Dragon moray eel
Pink whipray
Razorfish
Pipefish
Orange-barred garden eel
Porcupine Puffer
Green spotted puffer fish
Humpback Puffer
Senegal Bichir
Squarespot Anthias
Flashlight fish
Zebra shark
Whitetip reef shark
Sea anemone

See also 
 Shanghai Disneyland
 Shanghai Haichang Ocean Park

Notes

External links

Aquaria in China
Tourist attractions in Shanghai
Buildings and structures in Shanghai